The canton of La Roche-sur-Foron is an administrative division of the Haute-Savoie department, southeastern France. Its borders were modified at the French canton reorganisation which came into effect in March 2015. Its seat is in La Roche-sur-Foron.

It consists of the following communes:

Allonzier-la-Caille
Amancy
Andilly
Arbusigny
Cercier
Cernex
La Chapelle-Rambaud
Copponex
Cornier
Cruseilles
Cuvat
Etaux
Menthonnex-en-Bornes
Monnetier-Mornex
La Muraz
Nangy
Pers-Jussy
Reignier-Esery
La Roche-sur-Foron
Saint-Blaise
Saint-Laurent
Saint-Sixt
Le Sappey
Scientrier
Villy-le-Bouveret
Villy-le-Pelloux
Vovray-en-Bornes

References

Cantons of Haute-Savoie